Michelskopf is a large hill in  Hesse, Germany.

Hills of Hesse